The Battle of Kalyan occurred between the Mughal Empire and Maratha Empire between 1682 and 1683. Bahadur Khan of the Mughal Empire defeated the Maratha army and took over Kalyan. The Marathas attempted a counter offensive, but failed and they were repulsed by Mughal forces.

See also
Battle of Sangamner

References

Kalyan
Kalyan
1683 in India
Kalyan
Kalyan